Nina Nittinger (born 16 June 1976) is a German former professional tennis player.

Nittinger reached a best singles ranking of 286 in the world and won two ITF titles. She won a further five ITF titles in doubles.

All of her WTA Tour main-draw appearances were in doubles, with her best performance coming at the 1999 Croatian Bol Ladies Open, where she and partner Amanda Grahame were quarterfinalists.

ITF Circuit finals

Singles: 4 (2–2)

Doubles: 9 (5–4)

References

External links
 
 

1976 births
Living people
German female tennis players